Eugène Claudius-Petit was a French politician. He participated in many governments under the Fourth Republic and was a proponent of Firminy Vert. He later added his pseudonym from the Resistance, "Claudius", to his name.

Early life and career 
He born on May 22, 1907, in Angers and died on October 24, 1989, in Paris.

The son of a railway worker, he attended primary school in his hometown and then became an apprentice and made his tour of France as a journeyman. He worked for a cabinetmaker in Paris and then joined the Rambault Furniture Company in Angers. He took courses in the hopes of becoming an art teacher. He later became anarchist in his political views and campaigned briefly in the libertarian movement. He also hosted a local union CGTU then joined after a meeting with Marc Sangnier.

He joined the French Resistance under the name Claudius. In 1942, he was part of the executive committee of Free Marksman in which Peter Degon later joined. In 1943 he became a founding member of the CNR where he represented the MUR (United Movements of Resistance). He left France for London and Algiers, where he was a delegate to the Provisional Consultative Assembly. After moving back to Paris, he chaired the National Liberation Movement.

He became a Companion of the Liberation, and was awarded the Croix de Guerre and the Legion of Honor.

Political career 

Claudius-Petit was elected as Member of the Loire to the first and second National Constituent Assembly and the National Assembly from 1946 to 1955 under the Democratic and Socialist Union of the Resistance (UDSR) party.

During the Fourth and the Fifth Republic, Claudius-Petit, who believed that politics was a struggle for "those who have nothing," became one of the central figures of modernist and social centrism. Appointed Minister of Reconstruction and Urbanism September 11, 1948, he led a broad policy and planning team in France after the war that repaired the damage of the conflict and dealt with housing shortages without precedent.

In February 1950, he appeared before the Council of Ministers to publish a pamphlet for national land use which is considered the founding manifesto of the policy conducted during the next half-century. To combat the excessive inequalities of settlement and activity, while balancing housing to industrial needs, Claudius-Petit advocated for a significant commitment in investment and regulation.

He was then Minister of Labour and Social Security from June 19 to September 3, 1954 under the government of Pierre Mendès France before becoming the interim Minister of Housing from August 14 to September 3, 1954. He resigned after the rejection of the EDC.

In the Ministry of Housing, he filed bills related to the acquisition of residential and industrial equipment, the procedure for codification of legislative texts concerning town planning and housing. He fought against slums.

Defeated in the 1956 election, he found his seat in the National Assembly from 1958 to 1962 and from 1967 to 1978 under various centrist roles.

From its inception in 1956 to 1977, he directed Sonacotra, the National Society for construction workers (Sonacotral, National Society of Algerian workers to build up the Evian agreements of 1962) Senior Manager of migrant workers' hostels in France.

He was a practicing Catholic, a fact reflected by his speech on the final day of the debate on the legalization of abortion in France, December 19, 1974: "In conclusion, and precisely because I did not let my spiritual beliefs at the door, I can not get rid of the solidarity that binds me to the society in which I live. To obey my demands, I am with those who suffer most, with those convicted as with those who are despised the most (...) Because of that, because of Him, I take my share of burden. I will fight against everything that leads to abortion, but I will vote for the law".

Firminy-Vert 

As a friend of Le Corbusier, he embarked on a massive renovation of the town of Firminy. Elected mayor in 1953, he dreamed of building next to the city, "a city of the twentieth century to the best of his time," a kind of small Brasilia, a compendium of modern architecture. In 1955, he governed several buildings by Le Corbusier, including a house of Culture, a "radiant city", a stage and the Church of St. Peter.

Honors 

 Commander of the Legion of Honor
 Companion of the Liberation - Decree of 19 October 1945
 Croix de Guerre 1939-1945 (2 citations)
 Médaille de la Résistance with Rosette
 Commander of Mérite Social
 Commander of the Rose blanche de Finlande
 Grand Officer of Ouissam Alaouite

Tributes 

 A dead-end road at Saint-Étienne, bears his name.
 An avenue at Bourges bears his name.
 A street in Angers is named after him.
 A district in the 14th arrondissement of Paris bears his name: Place Eugène Claudius-Petit
 His "attic" (chalet in Courchevel) called "The Pin" became a historical monument since 23 January 2006

Bibliography 

 « Pour un plan national d'aménagement du territoire », Les grands textes de l'aménagement du territoire et de la décentralisation.  Christel Alvergne, Pierre Musso, DATAR (Avant-propos de Jean-Pierre Raffarin, Premier ministre), 2004, 
 Benoît Pouvreau, Danièle Voldman, Un politique en architecture : Eugène Claudius-Petit (1907-1989), préf. de Dominique Claudius-Petit, éd. Le Moniteur, coll. « Architextes », 2004, 358 p.,
 Pouvreau Benedict, ""La politique d'aménagement du territoire d'Eugène Claudius-Petit" in XX (magazine), No. 79 -2003 / 3, p. 43-52 
 "Hommage à Eugène Claudius-Petit, fondateur du corps des architectes-conseils de l'État", Thotm, 2007, 36 p. link
 Biography on the website of the Order of the Liberation 
 Biography at the National Assembly

References 

 3ème séance du jeudi 28 novembre 1974 [archive]
 Nom des rues de Saint-Etienne [archive]
 http://www.parcoursinventaire.rhonealpes.fr/stationski/-La-Goupille-le-grenier-d-Eugene-.html  [archive] Description de « La Goupille »,

1907 births
1989 deaths
People from Maine-et-Loire
French Roman Catholics
Politicians from Pays de la Loire
Young Republic League politicians
Democratic and Socialist Union of the Resistance politicians
Centre Democracy and Progress politicians
French Ministers of Labour and Social Affairs
Members of the Constituent Assembly of France (1945)
Members of the Constituent Assembly of France (1946)
Deputies of the 1st National Assembly of the French Fourth Republic
Deputies of the 2nd National Assembly of the French Fourth Republic
Deputies of the 3rd National Assembly of the French Fourth Republic
Deputies of the 1st National Assembly of the French Fifth Republic
Deputies of the 3rd National Assembly of the French Fifth Republic
Deputies of the 4th National Assembly of the French Fifth Republic
Deputies of the 5th National Assembly of the French Fifth Republic
French Resistance members
Companions of the Liberation
Recipients of the Croix de Guerre 1939–1945 (France)
Recipients of the Resistance Medal
Recipients of the Legion of Honour